Gerald Robert Gray (born January 28, 1948) is Canadian retired professional ice hockey goaltender who played eight games in the National Hockey League.

Career 
Gray played with the Detroit Red Wings and New York Islanders between 1971 and 1972. The rest of his career, which lasted from 1968 to 1978, was spent in the minor leagues.

Career statistics

Regular season and playoffs

References

External links
 

1948 births
Living people
Canadian ice hockey goaltenders
Cleveland Barons (1937–1973) players
Detroit Red Wings players
Fort Worth Wings players
Ice hockey people from Ontario
Jacksonville Barons players
New Haven Nighthawks players
New York Islanders players
Ontario Hockey Association Senior A League (1890–1979) players
Sportspeople from Brantford
Tidewater Wings players